Breaking Bad: Criminal Elements was a mobile game based on the TV show with the same name. Players build their own drug empire under the wing of the show's two main characters, Walter White and Jesse Pinkman. Criminal Elements was loosely based on a previous attempt to bring a mobile game to market called Breaking Bad: Empire Business. The game released in June 2019 for both Android and iPhone. The game received lukewarm reviews and was closed on September 6, 2020.

Gameplay 
In the start of the game the player is hired as an employee to work with Walt and Jesse. The main objective was to work their way up the ladder of crime and eventually become their own kingpin.

They can also hire other well-known characters to work with, such as Saul Goodman, Gus Fring, Mike Ehrmantraut and many more. There are numerous activities and contracts that they can take to gain more resources.

There are three main parts/rooms of the game:
 Lab: This is where the player cooks meth and is able to sell it to make money. To make meth, the player needs to first collect a sufficient number of resources. As their empire grows, they can keep upgrading their lab and other buildings.
 Compound: This is where the player builds their constructions such as buildings, trucks, defense, labs, etc. They can also upgrade their constructions to improve the number of resources they are making periodically.
 Map: This is where the player plans out and attempts to make heists. They can look for supplies and raid other gang members in different districts and areas. They can make calls and prepare different units beforehand to help them on their heists.

The main types of resources are bricks, cash and gold. Bricks and cash can be acquired periodically depending on how advanced the player's constructions are, while gold can be acquired by completing achievements or in-app purchases and will allow the player to perform some premium services or to speed up wait time for different processes such as building or meth cooking time.

Players can also level up by gaining experience or "XP". The only way to gain XP is to build more or upgrade existing buildings. The higher level they are, the more constructions and upgrades they have access to.

Breaking Bad: Criminal Elements was similar to most mobile games, such as Clash of Clans, where it was necessary to play the game for long periods of time to develop and progress further in the game. Another option, which is the easiest and fastest way, is paying to win, which is not necessary to acquire all the rewards in the game, but still an option to do so.

Characters 
The game consists of numerous different characters that can be unlocked in different ways and be of assistance to the player. But there are main recurring characters that will often be dealt with.

 Walter White: One of the player's mentors who will often entrust them to accomplish different missions.
 Jesse Pinkman: The player's other mentor who will teach them how to do things, especially in the beginning of the game.
 Saul Goodman: Helps the player make calls to acquire new units.
 Mike Ehrmantraut: Contacts the player when they have any upcoming missions for them to go on.

The main way a player can get more characters is by first collecting SIM cards, a kind of currency needed to make calls. There are different kinds of phones to use, all with different levels and different SIM card types, that will get the player a number of characters with various skill sets depending on which kind of phone/SIM cards they used. For example, the premium gold phone will help call premium units to be used during a mission, and so on.

Release 
There were rumors and news about the release of a Breaking Bad game that will let players interact with their favorite characters "in a whole new way" as early as January 11, 2019.

Preregistration opened in April 2019 and on June 6, 2019, the game was officially released by FTX Games on both the App Store and Google Play. The game was developed with close collaboration with the creators of Breaking Bad so that it would feel accurate to the show.

References

External links 
 (archived)

2019 video games
Android (operating system) games
Breaking Bad
IOS games
Single-player video games
Video games based on television series
Video games developed in the United States